In formal semantics, subtrigging is the phenomenon whereby free choice items in episodic sentences require a modifier. For instance, the following sentence is not acceptable in English.

 *Any student signed the petition.

However, the sentence can be repaired by adding a post-nominal modifier such as a relative clause, prepositional phrase, or locative.

 Any student who went to the meeting signed the petition. (RC)
 Any student at the meeting signed the petition. (PP)
 Any student there. (locative)

See also

 Free choice inference
 Linguistic modality
 Negative polarity item

Notes

Semantics
Formal semantics (natural language)